Wee or WEE may refer to:

 Wee, a slang term for urine (see also wee-wee)
 Wee, short stature, or otherwise small

Anthroponym 
 Wee (surname), Chinese surname and name
 Wee Willie Harris, singer
 Wee Willie Webber, Philadelphia radio and television personality
 Wee Man, actor
 Pee-wee Herman, comedian
 Pee Wee Crayton, singer

Biochemistry 
 WEE virus, the western equine encephalitis virus
 Wee1, a nuclear protein

Arts 
 In the Wee Small Hours, album of Frank Sinatra
 In the Wee Small Hours of the Morning, song in this album
 The Wee Hours Revue, album by Roman Candle
 The Wee Free Men, comic fantasy novel
 The Pee-wee Herman Show (1980), stage show by Pee-wee Herman
 Big Top Pee-wee (1985), a film with Pee-wee Herman
 Pee-wee's Big Adventure (1988), a film with Pee-wee Herman
 Pee-wee's Playhouse (1986-1990), a program by Pee-wee Herman
 Pee-wee's Big Holiday (2016), a film with Pee-wee Herman
 Ooh Wee, song by Mark Ronson

Transport
 Weeley railway station, Tendring, England, National Rail station code WEE

See also
 
 WEEE, the Waste Electrical and Electronic Equipment Directive
 We (disambiguation)
 Wee Wee (disambiguation)
 Wee Wee Hill
 Wei (disambiguation)
 Wii, a Nintendo video game console